Sfatul Țării was a newspaper from the Republic of Moldova, founded in 1989. It was the newspaper of the Parliament of Moldova. Among the authors were: Val Butnaru, Iurie Bălan, Emilian Galaicu-Păun.

References

Newspapers established in 1989
Romanian-language newspapers published in Moldova